Clevea is a genus of liverworts belonging to the family Cleveaceae.

The genus was first described by Sextus Otto Lindberg in 1869.

The genus has almost cosmopolitan distribution.

Species:
 Clevea hyalina (Sommerf.) Lindb.

References

Marchantiales
Marchantiales genera